The women's 4 × 100 metres relay event at the 2009 Summer Universiade was held on 11–12 July.

Medalists

* Athletes who competed in heats only and received medals.

Results

Heats
Qualification: First 3 teams of each heat (Q) plus the next 2 fastest (q) qualified for the final.

Final

References

 Results (archived)

Relay
2009 in women's athletics
2009